Brad Farmerie is a chef who served as the executive chef of Public and Saxon + Parole in New York City which were owned and operated by AvroKO Hospitality Group.

Career
Farmerie was raised in Pittsburgh, Pennsylvania. After graduating from North Allegheny Senior High School in 1991 he attended Penn State, pursuing a mechanical engineering degree. Two years later, he left college and began exploring various world cuisines. He attended Le Cordon Bleu in London, United Kingdom, graduating in 1996. He trained under the guidance of experienced chefs at several restaurants including Chez Nico, Le Manoir aux Quat' Saisons and Coast, and the Sugar Club.

See also
List of Michelin starred restaurants

References

External links
PUBLIC
Brad Farmerie's page at Le Cordon Bleu London

Living people
American male chefs
Head chefs of Michelin starred restaurants
People from Pittsburgh
Alumni of Le Cordon Bleu
Penn State College of Engineering alumni
People from Clinton Hill, Brooklyn
Year of birth missing (living people)